

National team competitions

1986 FIBA Basketball World Cup Qualifiers 
1985 FIBA Asia Cup* at Malaysia:
  (5th title)
 
 
EuroBasket 1985 at West Germany:
  (14th title)
  
 
AfroBasket 1985 at Ivory Coast:
  (2nd title)
 
 

Notes:

(*) — The remaining four teams vied for the championship. Nevertheless, the Philippines clinch the title with a 3-0 win–loss record in the championship round as opposed to the 2-1 of South Korea and 1-2 record of China.

Player awards (NBA)

Regular Season MVP 

 Larry Bird, Boston Celtics

NBA Finals MVP 

 Kareem Abdul-Jabbar, Los Angeles Lakers

Slam Dunk Contest 

 Dominique Wilkins, Atlanta Hawks

Collegiate awards
 Men
John R. Wooden Award: Chris Mullin, St. John's
Frances Pomeroy Naismith Award: Bubba Jennings, Texas Tech
Associated Press College Basketball Player of the Year: Patrick Ewing, Georgetown
NCAA basketball tournament Most Outstanding Player: Pervis Ellison, Louisville
Associated Press College Basketball Coach of the Year: Bill Frieder, Michigan
Naismith Outstanding Contribution to Basketball: Hank Iba
 Women
Naismith College Player of the Year: Cheryl Miller, USC
Wade Trophy: Cheryl Miller, USC
Frances Pomeroy Naismith Award: Maria Stack, Gonzaga
NCAA basketball tournament Most Outstanding Player: Tracy Claxton, Old Dominion

Naismith Memorial Basketball Hall of Fame
Class of 1985:
Harold Anderson
Al Cervi
Marv Harshman
Nate Thurmond
Margaret Wade

Deaths
May 18 — Win Wilfong, 52, American NBA player (St. Louis Hawks, Cincinnati Royals)
August 8 — Bobby Laughlin, 74, American college coach (Morehead State)
September — Louie Sauer, American NBL player (Kankakee Gallagher Trojans)
September 2 — Bob Kinney, 64, American NBA player (Fort Wayne Pistons)
November 6 — Harold Bradley, 73, American college coach (Duke, Texas)

See also
 1985 in sports

References